Florian Schnitzer (born January 28, 1981) is a former German professional ice hockey player. He last played for Bietigheim Steelers in the 2nd Bundesliga.

Career statistics

References

External links

1981 births
Living people
Augsburger Panther players
Hamburg Freezers players
Krefeld Pinguine players
SC Bietigheim-Bissingen players
SC Riessersee players
Straubing Tigers players
German ice hockey right wingers
Sportspeople from Garmisch-Partenkirchen